Eero Kinnunen (born 2 August 1967) is an Estonian military offcier (Colonel).

He has been the commander of Viru Infantry Battalion in the Estonian Defence Forces and Harju military district in the Estonian Defence League. In 2022 he was appointed Estonia's attache to Ukraine.

In 2004 he was awarded with Order of the Cross of the Eagle, V class.

References

Living people
1967 births
Estonian military personnel
Recipients of the Military Order of the Cross of the Eagle, Class V